Otto Scrinzi (5 February 1918 in Lienz, Tirol – 2 January 2012 in Moosburg, Austria), was an Austrian neurologist, journalist and politician (VdU/FPÖ).

During the Austrian Anschluss with Nazi Germany and World War II, Scrinzi was a member of the Hitler Youth, the Nazi Party and an SA Sturmführer. Later, he became the leading representative of the German nationalist wing of the so-called “third camp” (Drittes Lager), namely the Federation of Independents (VdU) and later the Freedom Party of Austria (FPÖ). While he described himself as “national-conservative”, “right-wing” and “conservative”, others outside the FPÖ described him as a far-right politician.

He got the Decoration of Honour for Services to the Republic of Austria.

References

Austrian neurologists
Sturmabteilung personnel
Opinion journalists
Members of the National Council (Austria)
Freedom Party of Austria politicians
1918 births
2012 deaths
Recipients of the Decoration for Services to the Republic of Austria
People from Lienz
Austrian Nazis
Hitler Youth members